Paneče is a settlement in the Municipality of Laško in eastern Slovenia. It lies in the hills east of Rimske Toplice. Traditionally part of the Styria region, the area is now included with the rest of the municipality in the Savinja Statistical Region.

References

External links
Paneče on Geopedia

Populated places in the Municipality of Laško